Aleksandar Brđanin (born January 18, 1981) is a Bosnian-Herzegovinian retired football striker who last played with FK Vršac in the Serbian League Vojvodina.

Club career
Born in Ljubljana, SR Slovenia, he started playing in the youth teams of Red Star Belgrade and his first senior club was another Serbian club, OFK Beograd. Afterwards, he played with Ukrainian FC Metalurh Zaporizhzhia, Bosnian FK Leotar and FK Radnik Bijeljina, Timișoara and Montenegrin clubs FK Jedinstvo Bijelo Polje and FK Kom.

In summer 2010 Brđanin left Serbian side FK Sloboda Užice and moved to Uzbekistan to play with Mash'al Mubarek.

References

External links
 Met.Zaporizhya 2003-04 squad at EUFO

1981 births
Living people
Footballers from Ljubljana
Association football midfielders
Serbian footballers
Bosnia and Herzegovina footballers
OFK Beograd players
FC Metalurh Zaporizhzhia players
FK Leotar players
FK Radnik Bijeljina players
FK Jedinstvo Bijelo Polje players
FK Kom players
Kaposvári Rákóczi FC players
FK Sloboda Užice players
FK Mash'al Mubarek players
Barcsi SC footballers
OFK Žarkovo players
FK Vršac players
First League of Serbia and Montenegro players
Ukrainian Premier League players
Premier League of Bosnia and Herzegovina players
Uzbekistan Super League players
Nemzeti Bajnokság II players
Serbian First League players
Bosnia and Herzegovina expatriate footballers
Expatriate footballers in Ukraine
Bosnia and Herzegovina expatriate sportspeople in Ukraine
Expatriate footballers in Montenegro
Bosnia and Herzegovina expatriate sportspeople in Montenegro
Expatriate footballers in Hungary
Bosnia and Herzegovina expatriate sportspeople in Hungary
Expatriate footballers in Uzbekistan
Bosnia and Herzegovina expatriate sportspeople in Uzbekistan